Yevgeni Borisovich Kuznetsov (born 30 August 1961) is a Russian professional football coach and a former player.

Club career
He made his professional debut in the Soviet First League in 1980 for FC Shinnik Yaroslavl.
Kuznetsov played in the Soviet Union for Shinnik Yaroslavl and Spartak Moscow, for Swedish clubs Norrköping, Skellefteå, Öster, Mjällby and Karlskrona, in Russia for Lokomotiv Moscow, and for South Korean club Chunnam Dragons.

Honours
Olympic Champion: 1988 (team captain).
Soviet Top League champion: 1987, 1989.
Soviet Top League runner-up: 1983, 1984, 1985.
Soviet Top League bronze: 1982, 1986.
Russian Premier League runner-up: 1995.
Russian Cup winner: 1996 (played in the early stages of the 1995/96 tournament for FC Lokomotiv Moscow.
Allsvenskan runner-up: 1990, 1991, 1992.
Svenska Cupen winner: 1991.

European club competitions
UEFA Cup 1986–87 with FC Spartak Moscow : 5 games.
UEFA Cup 1987–88 with FC Spartak Moscow : 4 games.
European Cup 1988–89 with FC Spartak Moscow : 3 games.
UEFA Cup 1989–90 with FC Spartak Moscow : 4 games.
UEFA Cup 1995–96 with FC Lokomotiv Moscow : 1 game.

References

External links
 
 FIFA Player Statistics

1961 births
Footballers from Yaroslavl
Living people
Association football midfielders
Russian footballers
Soviet expatriate footballers
Soviet footballers
Russian expatriate footballers
Soviet football managers
Russian football managers
Russian expatriate football managers
FC Shinnik Yaroslavl players
FC Spartak Moscow players
IFK Norrköping players
FC Lokomotiv Moscow players
Jeonnam Dragons players
Östers IF players
Soviet Top League players
Allsvenskan players
Russian Premier League players
K League 1 players
Östers IF managers
FC Anzhi Makhachkala managers
Expatriate footballers in Sweden
Expatriate footballers in South Korea
Footballers at the 1988 Summer Olympics
Olympic footballers of the Soviet Union
Olympic gold medalists for the Soviet Union
Russian expatriate sportspeople in Sweden
Russian expatriate sportspeople in South Korea
Olympic medalists in football
Skellefteå FF players
Medalists at the 1988 Summer Olympics